The Office of the Prime Minister of Ethiopia is a government body tasked with reporting on highest executive branch of Ethiopia.

Task
It is all tasked with protecting the Prime Minister, and it also has a smaller branch inside of it the office of the First Lady of Ethiopia. It is under the Prime Minister, and thus an organization of the Prime Minister. It is a non direct semi parent organization of NISS, INSA, Ministry of Peace, and all other ministry's in the country. It reports to the nation of the Prime Ministers plans. Smaller organizations inside the Office of the Prime Minister are the Republican Guard, and National Security Department and other smaller offices.

References 

Government agencies of Ethiopia